Pandea rubra is a species of hydrozoans distinguished by an anthomedusan jellyfish with a bright red subumbrella. P. rubra are found in extremely deep and cold Pacific Ocean waters.

Nomenclature
Red paper lantern jellyfish is a common name for this animal because of its mantle that can crumple up or expand like a paper lantern. Another reason for the name was because it was first seen on the coast of Japan and was seen as sacred.

Anatomy
The red paper lantern is the most common type of P. rubra that has been recorded. This medusa has a transparent, bell-shaped hood measuring about 10 centimeters in diameter and 17 centimeters from top to bottom, with between 14 and 30 tentacles that extend up to 6 times the length of its body. Inside the transparent hood is a deep red colored mantle. JAMSTEC researcher Dr. Dhugal Lindsay is credited with naming it the paper lantern.

Range and habitat 
P. rubra has only been found in deep and cold ocean waters at only a few sites. So far reported from boreal to sub-boreal waters in the North Pacific and North Atlantic, and also in the Southern Ocean in Japan. They were found at depths between 450-1000m.
Environmental ranges:
  Depth range (m): 0 - 2697.5
  Temperature range (°C): -1.525 - 4.636
  Nitrate (umol/L): 23.305 - 41.314
  Salinity (PPS): 33.700 - 34.685
  Oxygen (mL/L): 0.881 - 8.065
  Phosphate (umol/L): 1.415 - 3.280
  Silicate (umol/L): 13.206 - 192.813

Behavior
P. rubra exhibits bioluminescence, light produced by a chemical reaction within a living organism. Bio-luminescence is a type of luminescence, which is the term for a light-producing chemical reaction. Bio-luminescence is a "cold light" in that less than 20% of the light generates heat.

References

External links
 

Pandeidae
Animals described in 1913